John Wynne Holdsworth (born 10 September 1884) was a rugby union player who represented Australia.

Holdsworth, a lock, was born in Sydney and claimed a total of 6 international rugby caps for Australia.

References

                   

Australian rugby union players
Australia international rugby union players
1884 births
Year of death missing
Rugby union players from Sydney
Rugby union locks